"Liar" is a song by Cuban-American singer Camila Cabello, from her second studio album Romance (2019). The pop song was written by Cabello, Ali Tamposi, Andrew Watt, Jon Bellion, Jordan Johnson, Stefan Johnson, Lionel Richie, Jenny Berggren, Jonas Berggren, Malin Berggren, and Ulf Ekberg. Production was handled by Watt, The Monsters & Strangerz and Bellion. It was released by Epic Records and Syco Music as a double lead single with "Shameless" on September 5, 2019. "Liar" consists of trumpets, bass drums and horns, and contains samples of Richie's 1983 song "All Night Long (All Night)" and Ace of Base's 1992 song "All That She Wants". The lyrics depict Cabello's rekindled emotions for a former partner.

"Liar" peaked at number 21 on the UK Singles Chart, number 31 on the Australian ARIA Singles Chart, and at number 52 on the US Billboard Hot 100. It was certified platinum in Australia, Brazil, Canada, Norway, Poland, and the United States. An accompanying music video was directed by Dave Meyers and depicts Cabello trapped inside a time loop sequence. The time loop was compared to Groundhog Day (1993) and Russian Doll (2019), while the music video itself was compared to Inception (2010). Cabello performed the song at several televised events.

Release
From August 31 to September 1, 2019, Cabello posted several teasers regarding her second project titled Romance (2019) to her social media accounts, which were scheduled to be released on September 5, 2019. The teasers included an image of Cabello seated around pillars signed 'R', a spoken-word video about love, and a clip of a key unlocking her mechanical heart. The first installment for the project was announced on September 3, 2019, as she uploaded a 15-second video of tarots displaying the names of the double singles "Shameless" and "Liar". Cabello explained her decision to release both songs simultaneously in a 2019 interview with Zach Sang, stating that she wanted people to become familiar with the sound of Romance. The senior vice president of Epic Records, Sandra Afloarei acknowledged that the dual promotion of both songs had a positive impact on radio stations and considered it to be "a sign of the times".

Composition
Musically, "Liar" is a pop song, which contains an "island", reggae, and pan-Caribbean and Spanish mélange influences. It samples Lionel Richie's 1983 song "All Night Long (All Night)" and Ace of Base's 1992 song "All That She Wants", which provides a jazz element to the song. "Liar" opens with a combination of trumpets, dance-based bass drums, and mariachi-inspired horns. Elements of Latin trap and flamenco are accompanied by electronic handclaps, which leads to the ska-pop chorus. It rapidly cycles through styles of "salsa, reggaetón, flamenco, ska, [and] ballad[s]".

"Liar" was written by Cabello, Alexandra Tamposi, Andrew Wotman, Jonathan Bellion, Jordan Johnson, Stefan Johnson, Jenny Berggren, Jonas Berggren, Malin Berggren, Ulf Ekberg and Lionel Richie, and produced by Wotman, The Monsters and the Strangerz and Bellion. According to the sheet music published at Musicnotes.com by Sony/ATV Music Publishing, the song was composed using  common time in the key of B minor. Cabello's vocal range spans from the low note of F3 to the high note of F5, giving the song a two octave vocal range. Throughout "Liar", Cabello "moans, whispers, and whimpers". The lyrics describe her experience of expressing feelings for a former partner, as she "seductively" claims to be a liar since "their hearts are so intertwined". Jon Pareles of The New York Times stated that Cabello "sings about how a certain kiss makes her lose control", while Rolling Stone writer Brittany Spanos noted that she "fall[s] deeper in love" during the chorus' lyrics, "Oh no, there you go / Making me a liar / Got me begging you for more / Oh no, there I go / Startin' up a fire".

Critical reception and commercial performance

Pareles wrote that "Liar" is a song which "border-hop[s] at the speed of pop". He listed the song at number 20 on his list of "The 54 Best Songs of 2019" and opined that is "a lighthearted plaint about the power of lust" which "work[s] nimbly and globally to hold elusive the pop attention span".

"Liar" debuted at number 56 on the US Billboard Hot 100 chart dated September 21, 2019. It peaked at number 52 on the chart dated November 2, 2019, and received a platinum certification by the Recording Industry Association of America (RIAA) on September 14, 2020, for sales of 1,000,000 equivalent-units. On the UK Singles Chart dated October 18, 2019, the song peaked at number 21 and remained on the chart for 13 weeks.

Music video

Background
Cabello shared a preview of the music video through social media on September 9, 2019, with a clip of her answering three questions on a polygraph. Cabello additionally stated that it was the "most fun video [she] ever made." The six-minute video was directed by Dave Meyers and  released on September 12, 2019. Writing for MTV News, Patrick Hosken considered the music video to be a "mini movie". Cabello portrays several fictional characters, while Euphoria actor Zak Steiner portrays her engaged fiancé and billionaire oil tycoon called Reese Kensington. Keiynan Lonsdale, Nataliz Jimenez, and Chelsea Brea also appear in supporting roles.

Synopsis

Cabello appears miserable while eating at an outdoor restaurant with her fiancé, Reese Kensington, who only sees her as his trophy wife. She is in a love triangle with Kensington, and a restaurant busboy who gives her a note. Cabello exclaims, "I hate this restaurant... and I want a cheeseburger!" before exiting the restaurant, which triggers the revival of previously wilted roses, waiters admitting that the food is 10 percent natural, two men "making out" while dating other women, a bald man removing a toupée, a man showing a sleeve tattoo to his mother, and a breakdancing waiter within 10 seconds. While Cabello reprimands Kensington, she is struck by a falling elephant from the sky. She immediately wakes up and is placed in a time loop, repeating the same scene with Kensington after dying in various accidents which progressively become more surreal; these include choking to death, being run over by a horde of cyclists, and being swarmed by drones. Cabello inadvertently sets alight Kensington's mansion after burning the note given to her by the busboy, and escapes with "frizzed" hair.

Cabello is taken away by the Truth Police to be placed on a polygraph machine while wearing a straitjacket. Kensington questions her by pulling out a necklace and dildo from her purse. Cabello awakes from the nightmare sequence following the polygraph interrogation, which seemingly breaks the time loop as she abandons Kensington for the busboy. A digitally animated bird then flies into the room as three Latina talk show hosts including the main host and Cabello's alter ego La Flaca, and co-anchors Gordita and Tammy, comically criticize Cabello's actions and appearance.

Reception
Liz Calvario of Entertainment Tonight commented that the music video is "telenovela-inspired" and described it as "fascinating", while Karen Gwee of NME considered it to be "comedic" and "hilariously absurd". Billboard writer Taylor Weatherby praised Cabello's acting skills and described the music video as a "cinematic masterpiece". Writing for Rolling Stone, Althea Legaspi summarized the plot as "Cabello reliving a number of scenes that get progressively more ridiculous and humorous as she tries to escape her conflicting emotions", and noted that the music video contained similarities to the song's lyrics depicting a relationship while constantly denying their own emotions. She also compared the time loop sequence to the 1993 film Groundhog Day. Hosken stated that the "extravagant" music video is similar to the 2019 streaming television series Russian Doll than Groundhog Day, contrasting Natasha Lyonne's "sense of purpose" in the former to Bill Murray's "aimless hedonism" in the latter. He added that the plot is "secondary to the overall experience" which he compared to the "mindfuckery" of the 2010 film Inception, and praised the cinematic scope, which he singled out "the pink shot of Cabello amid a sea of flamingos" as "downright dazzling" and acknowledged that she enjoyed portraying an increasingly unhinged person. Wade Sheridan of United Press International (UPI) additionally compared the time loop sequence to Groundhog Day and Russian Doll.

Live performances
Cabello debuted the live performance of "Liar" at the iHeartRadio Music Festival on September 20, 2019, as the second-last song on her setlist. Katie Atkinson of Billboard opined that the song's horn arrangement suited a live environment, while Hayden Brooks of iHeartRadio considered her performance with the backup dancers to have high energy. Cabello performed the song at the Fillmore Miami Beach in a private concert hosted by Verizon Up on September 25, 2019. Cabello wore a white catsuit covered in bandages with white heels and "long curly locks", as she performed with a hip-swaying dance while clouds appeared on the screen's background. On October 2, 2019, she appeared on BBC Radio 1's Live Lounge segment to perform "Liar" and a cover of Lewis Capaldi's 2018 song "Someone You Loved". Cabello performed the song on The Graham Norton Show dated October 25, 2019, where she embraced Emilia Clarke following the performance. Cabello performed "Liar" at the iHeartRadio Jingle Ball in New York City on December 13, 2019, while wearing a pearl corset with latex pants. During her virtual concert series titled 'Priceless Experiences at Home' which was released on July 15, 2020, Cabello performed "Liar" in a piano medley with "Señorita" and "My Oh My" by incorporating several vocal layers.

Throughout the Born Pink World Tour by South Korean girl group Blackpink, member Jisoo performed a solo cover of "Liar" while sporting a red outfit, which was positively received by Cabello. During their tour at the Banc of California Stadium in Los Angeles on November 19, 2022, Jisoo performed the song with Cabello, with the latter appearing in customized Blackpink-branded attire.

Track listings

Credits and personnel
Credits adapted from the liner notes of Romance.

Recording
 Recorded at Gold Tooth Music (Beverly Hills, California) and SARM Studios (London, England)
 Mixed at MixStar Studios (Virginia Beach, Virginia)
 Mastered at the Mastering Palace (New York City, New York)

Personnel

 Camila Cabello vocals, songwriting
 The Monsters and the Strangerz production, keyboards
 Andrew Watt production, songwriting, guitar, keyboards
 Jon Bellion miscellaneous production, songwriting
 Alexandra Tamposi songwriting
 Jordan Johnson songwriting
 Stefan Johnson songwriting
 Jenny Berggren songwriting
 Jonas Berggren songwriting
 Malin Berggren songwriting
 Ulf Ekberg songwriting
 Lionel Richie songwriting
 John Hanes mixing
 Serban Ghenea mixing
 Paul Lamalfa recording
 Dave Kutch mastering

Sample credits
 "Liar" contains a sample of "All Night Long (All Night)" (1983) performed and written by Lionel Richie, and "All That She Wants" (1992) performed by Ace of Base and written by members Ulf Ekberg, Malin Berggren, Jenny Berggren and Jonas Berggren.

Charts

Weekly charts

Year-end charts

Certifications

Release history

See also
 List of number-one singles of 2019 (Poland)
 List of number-one singles of 2020 (Poland)

References

2019 singles
2019 songs
Camila Cabello songs
Epic Records singles
Number-one singles in Poland
Syco Music singles
Songs written by Ali Tamposi
Songs written by Andrew Watt (record producer)
Songs written by Camila Cabello
Songs written by Jenny Berggren
Songs written by Jonas Berggren
Songs written by Jon Bellion
Songs written by Jordan Johnson (songwriter)
Songs written by Lionel Richie
Songs written by Linn Berggren
Songs written by Stefan Johnson
Songs written by Ulf Ekberg
Song recordings produced by the Monsters & Strangerz
Music videos directed by Dave Meyers (director)